Thomas Garnett (1900 – 10 January 1950) was an English professional association footballer who played as a winger. He played in the Football League Third Division North for Nelson in the 1921–22 season. His single league appearance for the club came on 14 January 1922 in the 0–2 loss to Ashington at Seedhill.

References

1900 births
1950 deaths
Footballers from Burnley
English footballers
Association football wingers
Nelson F.C. players
English Football League players